Foxcroft Academy is a private preparatory high school located in Dover-Foxcroft, Piscataquis County, Maine. Chartered by the Maine legislature in 1823, Foxcroft Academy was established just a few years after the incorporation of the town of Foxcroft itself.  From modest beginnings in a wood frame building for which the town appropriated $100, the Academy now occupies a 125-acre campus with a full complement of academic, athletic, and residential facilities. Today more than 350 day students are enrolled from the surrounding towns of Dover-Foxcroft, Sebec, Charleston, Bowerbank, Monson, and Harmony, with an additional 100 international students. Foxcroft Academy is accredited by the New England Association of Schools and Colleges and a member of the Independent School Association of Northern New England, College Board and the National Association of Independent Schools.

Academics 
Foxcroft Academy is an Apple Distinguished School.

The Academy has 25 Visual and Performing Arts courses: Art I, Ceramics, Sculptural Welding, Studio Art, AP Studio Art, Digital Photography, Yearbook Production, Filmmaking, Applied Media Production, Intro to Theater, Acting in a One-Act Play, Acting in a Musical, Band, Chorus, Intro to Guitar, Guitar II, Rock Band, Intro to Piano, Jazz Ensemble, Jazz Improvisation, Jazz Improvisation II, Woodwind Ensemble, Percussion Ensemble, Orchestra/Chamber Ensemble, and Select Choir.

Athletics 
Foxcroft Academy’s 23 varsity athletic teams have combined to win 21 state titles–11 in the past 11 years–and have also won four MPA Sportsmanship Awards in the past two years alone.

Notable alumni
 Corey Beaulieu (1983-), lead guitarist of the Florida metal band Trivium
 Frank E. Guernsey (1866-1927), U.S. Representative from Maine
 Charles E. Littlefield (1851-1915), U.S. Representative from Maine
 David Mallett (1951-), singer-songwriter|
 Sir Harry Oakes, 1st Baronet (1874-1943), gold mine owner, entrepreneur, investor and philanthropist
 Henry Otis Pratt (1838-1931), U.S. Representative from Iowa
 Dean Smith, winner of the Walter Byars Awards
 Lillian M. N. Stevens (1844-1914), temperance worker
 Lance E. Walker, Judge of the United States District Court for the District of Maine

External links

References

Private high schools in Maine
Schools in Piscataquis County, Maine
Boarding schools in Maine
Dover-Foxcroft, Maine
Preparatory schools in Maine
Educational institutions established in 1823
1823 establishments in Maine